Brickellia wislizeni is a Mexican species of flowering plants in the family Asteraceae. It is native to the states of Chihuahua and Durango in north-central Mexico.

formerly included
Brickellia wislizeni var. lanceolata A.Gray, now called Brickellia amplexicaulis B.L.Rob.

References

wislizeni
Flora of Mexico
Plants described in 1849